The desert sucker or Gila Mountain sucker (Catostomus clarkii),  is a freshwater species of ray-finned fish in the sucker family, endemic to the Great Basin and the Colorado River Basin in the United States. It inhabits rapids and fast-flowing streams with gravelly bottoms. It is a bi-colored fish with the upper parts olive brown to dark green, and the underparts silvery-tan or yellowish. The head is cylindrical, tapering to a thick-lipped mouth on the underside. There are three subspecies, found in different river basins, and some authorities allot this species its own genus Pantosteus.

Description
Desert suckers are bicolored; the back and upper sides are darker, olive-brown to dark green, and the belly and lower sides are deep-yellow to silvery tan. The scales on the upper half of the body have dark spots which form faint dashed lines. Their head is cylindrical, tapering to a blunt face with the lower lip about three times as thick as upper lip. The mouth is on the underside (ventral) of the face and is proportionately large. The dorsal fin of the desert sucker has 10 to 11 rays.

Distribution
The desert sucker is found in Nevada, Utah, Arizona and New Mexico. The desert sucker occurs in the lower Colorado River basin, below the Grand Canyon, particularly in the Gila River, and above the Grand Canyon in streams in the Virgin River basin, the White River basin and others.

Habitat
Desert suckers prefer ripply waters, rapids and flowing streams with gravelly bottoms.

Reproduction
Desert suckers reach maturity in their second year. Spawning occurs in winter and spring from January through May.

Subspecies
Three subspecies have been identified: the White River desert sucker, Catostomus clarkii intermedius (sometimes known as White River mountain sucker, Pantosteus intermedius),  Virgin River desert sucker, Catostomus clarkii utahensis, and the Meadow Valley Wash desert sucker, Catostomus clarkii (unnamed).

Some ichthyologists regarded these as  members of the genus Pantosteus, but later authors regard Pantosteus as a subgenus of  Catostomus.  There are suggestions of hybridization between Catostomus clarkii and Catostomus insignis.

Notes

References
 Lee, David S. et al.  (1980) Atlas of North American Freshwater Fishes North Carolina State Museum of Natural History, Patricia Ledlie Bookseller Inc, 
 Clarkson, Robert W. and Minckley, W. L. (1988) "Morphology and foods of Arizona catostomid Fishes: Catostomus insignis, Pantosteus clarki, and their putative hybrids" Copeia 1988: pp. 422–433
 Sublette, James E.; Hatch, Michael D. and Sublette, Mary (1990) "Catostomus (Pantosteus) clarki Baird and Girard - desert sucker" The Fishes of New Mexico University of New Mexico Press, Albuquerque, pp. 205–207, 
 Smith, G. R. 1992. "Phylogeny and biogeography of the Catostomidae, freshwater fishes of North America and Asia" Pages 778-826 In Mayden, R. L. (ed.) (1992) Systematics, historical ecology, and North American freshwater fishes Stanford Univ. Press, Stanford, California,

External links
 "Catostomus clarkii" ITIS
 Fishbase
 "Catostomus clarkii" NatureServe search with "Catostomus clarkii" as search term.

Desert sucker
Endemic fauna of the United States
Fish of the Western United States
Freshwater fish of the United States
Fauna of the Southwestern United States
Fauna of the Great Basin
Fauna of the Mojave Desert
Fauna of the Lower Colorado River Valley
Taxa named by Spencer Fullerton Baird
Taxa named by Charles Frédéric Girard
Fish described in 1854
Taxobox binomials not recognized by IUCN